Wilhelmina Lewellen (born December 9, 1937) is an American politician who served in the Arkansas House of Representatives from the 34th district from 2005 to 2011.

References

1937 births
Living people
Democratic Party members of the Arkansas House of Representatives
African-American state legislators in Arkansas
Women state legislators in Arkansas
African-American women in politics
21st-century African-American people
21st-century African-American women
20th-century African-American people
20th-century African-American women